The Gladstone station is located in Gladstone, Manitoba, Canada. The station is served by Via Rail's Winnipeg–Churchill train.

References 

Via Rail stations in Manitoba
Railway stations in Manitoba